Suchá is a municipality and village in Jihlava District in the Vysočina Region of the Czech Republic. It has about 300 inhabitants.

Administrative parts
Villages of Beranovec and Prostředkovice are administrative parts of Suchá.

History
The first written mention of Suchá is from 1405.

References

Villages in Jihlava District